The R734 road is a regional road in County Wexford, Ireland. It travels from the R733 road at Slaght to Hook Head Lighthouse via the village of Fethard-on-Sea.

References

Regional roads in the Republic of Ireland
Roads in County Wexford